Roland Rudolph Hinton (June 1, 1926 – January 17, 1974), nicknamed "Archie", was an American Negro league pitcher in the 1940s.

A native of Raleigh, North Carolina, Hinton attended Santa Monica High School. He played for the Baltimore Elite Giants in 1945 and 1946, and died in San Francisco, California in 1974 at age 47.

References

External links
 and Seamheads

1926 births
1974 deaths
Baltimore Elite Giants players
Baseball pitchers
Baseball players from Raleigh, North Carolina